Joo Min-jin (Hangul: 주민진, Hanja: 朱敏眞) (born 1 August 1983 in Seoul) is a retired South Korean short track speed skater.

She who won a gold medal in the 3000 m relay at the 2002 Winter Olympics, together with teammates Choi Eun-kyung, Park Hye-won, and Choi Min-kyung.

External links
 
 

1983 births
Living people
South Korean female short track speed skaters
Olympic short track speed skaters of South Korea
Olympic gold medalists for South Korea
Olympic medalists in short track speed skating
Short track speed skaters at the 2002 Winter Olympics
Medalists at the 2002 Winter Olympics
Asian Games medalists in short track speed skating
Asian Games gold medalists for South Korea
Short track speed skaters at the 2003 Asian Winter Games
Medalists at the 2003 Asian Winter Games
21st-century South Korean women